Novaya Kvasnikovka is a rural locality (a selo) and the administrative center of Novokvasnikovskoye Rural Settlement, Staropoltavsky District, Volgograd Oblast, Russia. The population was 603 as of 2010. There are 4 streets.

Geography 
Novaya Kvasnikovka is located on the left bank of the Yeruslan River, 13 km north of Staraya Poltavka (the district's administrative centre) by road. Mirnoye is the nearest rural locality.

References 

Rural localities in Staropoltavsky District